Sierra Gorda Mine in Chile is a copper and molybdenum open pit mine which started production on October 1, 2014.

Sierra Gorda SCM is the project company operating the mine.  KGHM International Ltd (55%) and South32 (45%) are the owners of Sierra Gorda SCM.

Feasibilities studies were done on 2011 by Fluor Corporation. Other major milestones of the Copper-Molybdenum mine includes EPCM contracts and respective loan agreements to finance the construction both done on 2012, followed by water pipeline construction in 2013 and finally mine production starting in October 2014.

References

2014 establishments in Chile
Copper mines in Chile
Molybdenum mines
Surface mines in Chile
Mines in Antofagasta Region